Ilema virescens is a moth in the family Erebidae first described by Frederic Moore in 1879. It is found in India.

References

Lymantriinae
Moths described in 1879